Mohammad Amin is a Bangladesh Awami League politician and the former Member of Parliament of Rangpur-2. He was a Member of the 3rd National Assembly of Pakistan as a representative of East Pakistan.

Career
Amin was elected to parliament from Rangpur-2 as a Bangladesh Awami League candidate in 1979. He was a Member of the 3rd National Assembly of Pakistan representing Rangpur-VI.

References

Awami League politicians
Living people
2nd Jatiya Sangsad members
Year of birth missing (living people)